St John the Baptist is a Church of England parish church on the Ermine Estate in the city of Lincoln, England. Designed by Sam Scorer and consecrated in 1963, it is a Grade II* listed building.

History
The Ermine Estate is a large 1950s council estate located approximately 2 km north of Lincoln city centre. The estate was built mostly 1952-1958 as a response to post-war housing shortages. The church is on Sudbrooke Drive in Ermine East. The original temporary Anglican church and  combined community centre were the first public buildings opened on the estate in 1956.

The new, permanent church was completed on the estate in 1963. The architect was Sam Scorer of D. Clarke Hall, Scorer & Bright (now known as Scorer Hawkins Architects) in Lincoln.  

It was planned as a “tent of meeting” rather than a “static temple”, and was described in the Church Times in 1963 as "Britain's most modern church". The Vicar who commissioned it, the Revd John Hodgkinson, wrote "the emphasis was very much on church as people rather than a building".

In 1995, it became a Grade II* listed building.

Description

The church's roof is a hyperbolic paraboloid rising from two points on the ground to north and south. The roof structure is of concrete, covered with aluminium. The building has a hexagonal floor plan and concrete walls.  The east wall is dominated by abstract stained glass designed by Keith New, who helped design the windows of Coventry Cathedral. The altar, font and pulpit, by Scorer, are of cast concrete. The altar is raised on four steps in a circular sanctuary area to the eastern side of the hexagon. The font is placed in the central aisle, in front of the altar.

References

External links

Scorer Hawkins Architects
"St John Ermine: liturgical innovation and community" Information as to how St John the Baptist came to be designed
"Yesterday’s Church of Tomorrow; St. John the Baptist, Ermine Estate" by Karolina Szynalska

Literature
 Antram N. (revised), Pevsner N. & Harris J., (1989), The Buildings of England: Lincolnshire, Yale University Press.

Lincoln
Lincoln
Churches completed in 1963
Churches in Lincoln, England
Lincoln